Anna Louise Wilson (born 1 May 1977) is a United States-born Olympic swimmer from New Zealand.

Wilson was born in 1977 in Iowa City in the U.S. state of Iowa. Wilson, Elizabeth Van Welie, Scott Cameron, and Danyon Loader all trained under swimming coach Duncan Laing at Moana Pool in Dunedin, New Zealand at the same time. In 1991, she set an Otago record in 100 m freestyle that would stand for 20 years. In 1993, she set an Otago senior women's record in 1500 m freestyle that would stand until 2009. In 1995, she set a national women's aged 17 100 m breaststroke record; it stood for 18 years until it was broken by Natasha Lloyd in 2013. Wilson's Otago 100 m individual medley women's open record stood until broken in 2012. As of 2016, she still holds four national age group records.

Wilson represented New Zealand at the 1994 Commonwealth Games in Victoria, British Columbia, Canada, in six events. Later in the same year, she competed at the World Aquatics Championships held at Foro Italico in Rome, Italy.

Wilson was one of the 14 swimmers who represented New Zealand at the 1996 Summer Olympics in Atlanta, United States, and she competed at five events. Wilson was in a team with Dionne Bainbridge, Sarah Catherwood, and Alison Fitch to compete in the 4 × 200 metre freestyle relay. They came fifth in their heat and did not qualify for the final; their overall placement was 11th out of 21 teams. In the 100 metre breaststroke, she came 31st out of 46 competitors. In the 200 metre individual medley, she came 25th out of 43 competitors. In the 400 metre individual medley, she came 24th out of 31 competitors. Wilson was in a team with Lydia Lipscombe, Anna Simcic, and Alison Fitch to compete in the 4 × 100 metre medley relay. They came sixth in their heat and did not qualify for the final; their overall placement was 19th out of 24 teams. Wilson is New Zealand Olympian number 747.

Wilson's portrait is included on the wall of fame at Moana Pool. She is in the Hall of Fame at Swimming New Zealand.

References

Living people
1977 births
People from Iowa City, Iowa
Swimmers from Dunedin
Olympic swimmers of New Zealand
Swimmers at the 1996 Summer Olympics
Swimmers at the 1994 Commonwealth Games
Commonwealth Games competitors for New Zealand
20th-century New Zealand women